Helen Rowland (credited in her early films as Baby Helen Rowland, or from the character she played in her second film, Baby Helen Lee; born ) is an American child actress who appeared in over ten films in the 1920s, starting with the 1922 adaptation of George Eliot's 1861 novel Silas Marner. Her last two roles were in sound films.

Filmography
 Silas Marner (1922) as Eppie
 What's Wrong with the Women? (credited as Baby Helen Lee) (1922)
 Timothy's Quest (1922) as Lady Gay
 Jacqueline (1923)
 His Children's Children
 The Empty Cradle (1923) - as Baby Louise
 The Daring Years  (1923) as LaMotte Sister
 Damaged Hearts (1924)
 The Making of O'Malley (1925) as Margie
 The Perfect Sap (1927) - as Cissie Alden

References

External links

1910s births
Possibly living people
Year of birth uncertain
20th-century American actresses
American child actresses
American silent film actresses